These are the late night schedules on all three networks for each calendar season beginning September 1976. All times are Eastern/Pacific.

PBS is not included, as member television stations have local flexibility over most of their schedules and broadcast times for network shows may vary, CBS and ABC are not included on the weekend schedules (as the networks do not offer late night programs of any kind on weekends).

Talk/Variety shows are highlighted in yellow, Local News & Programs are highlighted in white.

Monday-Friday

Saturday

Sunday

By network

ABC

Returning Series
ABC Late Night

Not returning from 1975-76
Good Night America!

CBS

Returning Series
The CBS Late Movie

NBC

Returning Series
The Midnight Special
NBC's Saturday Night (renamed Saturday Night Live)
The Tomorrow Show
The Tonight Show Starring Johnny Carson
Weekend

New Series
NBC Late Night Movie

United States late night network television schedules
1976 in American television
1977 in American television